The Lloyd Street Synagogue is an 1845 Greek Revival style synagogue building in Baltimore, Maryland.  One of the oldest synagogues in the United States, Lloyd Street was the first synagogue building erected in Maryland and is the third oldest synagogue building still standing in the United States.  Lloyd Street is now owned by the Jewish Museum of Maryland and is open to the public as a museum in the Inner Harbor area of Baltimore.  It is listed on the National Register of Historic Places.

History
Lloyd Street was built by the Baltimore Hebrew Congregation, incorporated on January 29, 1830. In 1889, the building was sold to The St. John the Baptist Roman Catholic Church, a parish that served mainly immigrants from Lithuania, which used the building until 1905. In 1905, it was sold to congregation Shomrei Mishmeres HaKodesh, an Orthodox Jewish congregation of immigrants from Eastern Europe, which continued to use the building until 1963, when the building was threatened with demolition. The effort to preserve Lloyd Street was the impetus for the founding of the Jewish Historical Society of Maryland, now the Jewish Museum of Maryland.

Baltimore architects Robert Cary Long, Jr. and William Reasin designed the building in the fashionable Greek Revival style. Four doric columns support a classic pediment, all painted light pink.  The body of the building is brick.  The building is a near-twin of St. Peter the Apostle Church, designed by Long in 1842.

Lloyd Street is the third oldest synagogue building in the United States (several earlier buildings are no longer standing.)  The two oldest synagogue buildings, both still in active use, are the Touro Synagogue in Newport, Rhode Island and Kahal Kadosh Beth Elohim Synagogue, in Charleston, South Carolina.

It was listed on the National Register of Historic Places in 1978.

In 2011, archaeologists uncovered a mikveh under the synagogue. It is believed to be the oldest known mikveh in the United States.

Gallery

See also
Oldest synagogues in the United States

References

External links

, including undated photo, at Maryland Historical Trust

The Jewish Museum of Maryland website
Lloyd Street Synagogue – Explore Baltimore Heritage
National Park Service website

Jonestown, Baltimore
Synagogues completed in 1845
Former synagogues in Maryland
Greek Revival synagogues
Lithuanian-Jewish culture in Maryland
Properties of religious function on the National Register of Historic Places in Baltimore
Greek Revival church buildings in Maryland
Synagogues preserved as museums
Synagogues in Baltimore
Museums in Baltimore
Historic American Buildings Survey in Baltimore
Former Roman Catholic church buildings in Maryland
Synagogues on the National Register of Historic Places in Maryland
Baltimore City Landmarks